Attorney-General v Guardian Newspapers Ltd (No 2) [1990] 1 AC 109 is a UK copyright law and English trusts law case, concerning the confidentiality, profits and copyrights. It established that there can be an injunction and an award of monetary compensation or an account of profits.

Facts
A book was written by an MI5 agent which disclosed secrets belonging to the agency. The book was not allowed to be published in the UK due to an injunction and instead was published in the United States. The Guardian wanted to write about what the book was about.
 it published

Judgment
Lord Goff stated that "the copyright in the book, including the film rights, are held by him on constructive trust for the confider".

See also

English trust law

Notes

References

English trusts case law
House of Lords cases
1990 in British law
1990 in case law